Chris Dawson (born 22 August 1979) is a former footballer who played in Europe and Asia, and with the Seychelles national football team.

A midfielder, Dawson played for Bolton Wanderers before leaving England for Malaysia where he played for Kuala Lumpur. After which he returned to England and joined Leigh RMI before moving onto Bromsgrove Rovers FC. Dawson has 4 international caps for the Seychelles.

External links
 
 

1979 births
Living people
People with acquired Seychellois citizenship
Seychellois footballers
Seychelles international footballers
English footballers
English people of Seychellois descent
Seychellois expatriate footballers
Seychellois expatriate sportspeople in Malaysia
Expatriate footballers in Malaysia
Footballers from Coventry
Bolton Wanderers F.C. players
Association football midfielders
English expatriate sportspeople in Malaysia